Chess at the 2009 Asian Indoor Games was held in Vietnam from 31 October to 7 November 2009. All chess events held in Quảng Ninh Gymnasium.

Medalists

Medal table

Results

Men's individual rapid

Round 1
1–3 November

Knockout round

Women's individual rapid

Round 1
1–3 November

Knockout round

Mixed team blitz

Round 1
31 October

Knockout round
1 November

Mixed team rapid

Round 1
5–6 November

Knockout round
7 November

References 
 Official site
 www.chess-results.com
 www.vietnamchess.com.vn (Chess)

2009 Asian Indoor Games events
2009 in chess
Asian Indoor Games 2009
2009